Clifford James Tabin (born 1954) is chairman of the Department of Genetics at Harvard Medical School.

Education
Tabin was educated at the University of Chicago where he was awarded a BS in physics in 1976. He went on to graduate school at Massachusetts Institute of Technology and was awarded a PhD in 1984 for work on the regulation of gene expression in the Ras subfamily of oncogenes supervised by Robert Weinberg based in the MIT Department of Biology. In Weinberg's lab, Tabin constructed murine leukemia virus, the first recombinant retrovirus that could be used as a eukaryotic vector.

Career
Following his PhD, Tabin did postdoctoral research with Douglas A. Melton at Harvard University, then moved to Massachusetts General Hospital where he worked on the molecular biology of limb development. He was appointed to the faculty in the Department of Genetics at Harvard Medical School in 1989, and promoted to full professor in 1997 and chairman of the department in January 2007.

Research
 Tabin's research investigates the genetic regulation of vertebrate development, combining classical methods of experimental embryology with modern molecular and genetic techniques for regulating gene expression during embryogenesis.

Previously Tabin has worked on retroviruses, homeobox genes, oncogenes, developmental biology and evolution. Early in his research he investigated limb regeneration in the salamander, and described the expression of retinoic acid receptor and Hox genes in the blastema. Comparative studies by Ann Burke in his lab showed that differences in boundaries of Hox gene expression correlated with differences in skeletal morphology. The Tabin laboratory adjoins the laboratory of Connie Cepko.

Awards and honors
Tabin was elected a Foreign Member of the Royal Society (ForMemRS) in 2014. His nomination reads: 

Tabin has also been awarded the Edwin Conklin Medal in 2012, the March of Dimes Prize in Developmental Biology jointly with Philip A. Beachy in 2008 and the NAS Award in Molecular Biology in 1999. He was elected a member of the National Academy of Sciences in 2007
and the American Academy of Arts and Sciences in 2000. He was elected a Member of the American Philosophical Society in 2019.

Personal life
Tabin is the son of Julius Tabin, a nuclear physicist who worked with Enrico Fermi on the Manhattan Project in Los Alamos National Laboratory in New Mexico during World War II. He has a brother, Geoff Tabin, and two children.  Tabin appears as himself in a BBC Horizon programme titled Hopeful Monsters.

References

1954 births
Living people
New Trier High School alumni
University of Chicago alumni
Massachusetts Institute of Technology alumni
American geneticists
Harvard Medical School faculty
Foreign Members of the Royal Society
Members of the United States National Academy of Sciences
Members of the American Philosophical Society
Charles H. Revson Foundation